Bad Dream(s) may refer to:

Nightmare

Books and comics 
Bad Dreams, a novel by Fyodor Sologub
Bad Dreams, a novel by Kim Newman
Bad Dreams (Winnick comics), a five issue 2014 comic book series by Gary Winnick

Film and TV 
Bad Dreams (film), a 1988 horror film
"Bad Dreams" (The Wire), a 2003 episode of the TV series The Wire
"Bad Dreams" (Fringe), a 2009 episode of the television series Fringe

Music

Albums
Bad Dream (album), an album by Dimmi Argus
Bad Dreams (Swollen Members album), 2001
Bad Dreams (Ike Turner album), 1973
Bad Dreams, an album by Blondel

Songs
"Bad Dream" (song), a 2017 song by The Jungle Giants 
"A Bad Dream", a 2007 song by Keane
"Bad Dream", a song by Exo from Don't Mess Up My Tempo
"Bad Dreams", a song by Joni Mitchell from Shine